Turkey participated in the 2005 Islamic Solidarity Games held in Mecca, Saudi Arabia from 8 to 20 April 2005.

Medalists

| width="78%" align="left" valign="top" |

| width="22%" align="left" valign="top" |

References

2005
Islamic Solidarity Games